Wadi Khureitun or Nahal Tekoa is a wadi in a deep ravine in the Judaean Desert in the West Bank, west of the Dead Sea, springing near Tekoa.

Name
The Hebrew name, Nahal Tekoa ("Tekoa Stream"), and the English name used in some Christian contexts, Tekoa Valley, is derived from the ancient Judahite town of Tekoa.

The Arabic name, Wadi Khureitun, comes from the early Christian hermit, Saint Chariton the Confessor, who founded his third lavra in this valley.

Description, history, archaeology
A hiking path on the west of the wadi passes a number of prehistoric caves on its way south to the Chariton Monastery ruins.

The archaeological Stone Age (Mesolithic and Neolithic) site of El Khiam is located in this area.

Saint Chariton the Confessor (end of 3rd century-ca. 350) founded here the Lavra of Souka, later called the Old Lavra, and today popularly known as the Chariton Monastery.

Existing karstic caves from the chalk stone of the wadi were expanded and used as hermit abodes by monks from the lavras of Saint Chariton and of a later desert monk and saint, Euthymius the Great.

Modern Tekoa's former chief rabbi Menachem Froman's son, Tzuri, lived in the desert canyon wadi behind the town, in a cave.

References

Wadis of the West Bank
Judaean Desert